This is a list of films released in Japan in 1973. In 1973, there were 2530 movie theatres in Japan, with 1332 showing only domestic films and 556 showing both domestic and imported films. In total, there were 405 Japanese films released in 1973. In total, domestic films grossed 19,458 million yen in 1973.

See also
1973 in Japan
1973 in Japanese television

Footnotes

Sources

External links
Japanese films of 1973 at the Internet Movie Database

1973
Japanese
Films